Switch On is the eighth extended play by South Korean boy group Astro. It was released on August 2, 2021, by Fantagio Music and distributed by Kakao Entertainment. The album contains six songs including the lead single "After Midnight".

Track listing

Charts

Weekly charts

Year-end charts

Accolades

Release history

See also
 List of Gaon Album Chart number ones of 2021

References 

2021 EPs
Astro (South Korean band) albums